George Richards (10 May 1880 – 1 November 1959) was an English footballer who played as a wing half (and sometimes inside left) in the Football League with Derby County in the 1900s and 1910s. His final game for Derby came on 7 February 1914.

He was born in Castle Donington, Leicestershire and played for local teams before signing for First Division side Derby County in the 1901-02 season. He went on to make 284 Football League appearances for Derby, scoring 33 times. He was a member of the Derby team that were runners-up  in the 1903 FA Cup Final.

On 1 June 1909, Richards made his only appearance for England against Austria, having been a reserve for the match against Scotland earlier that year. He also toured with the FA party in South Africa in 1910.

Honours
Derby County
Football League Second Division champions: 1911–12
FA Cup finalists: 1903

References

External links

1880 births
1959 deaths
English footballers
Footballers from Leicestershire
Association football wing halves
England international footballers
English Football League players
Derby County F.C. players
Whitwick White Cross F.C. players
People from Castle Donington
FA Cup Final players